Black River is a locality and small rural community in the local government area of Circular Head, in the North West region of Tasmania. Bass Strait forms most of the northern boundary, while the stream named “Black River” forms the western boundary. The 2016 census determined a population of 35 for the state suburb of Black River.

History
The locality name may have originally been “Blackwall”, but the current name has been in use since about 1878. It is likely that the locality was named for the adjacent river.

Road infrastructure
The C225 route (Mawbanna Road) intersects with the Bass Highway in the locality, passing through to the south-east on its way to Mawbanna.

Notable people
 Fergus Medwin, Australian politician

References

Localities of Circular Head Council
Towns in Tasmania